"Hot Lips" ("When He Plays Jazz He's Got - Hot Lips") or "He's Got Hot Lips When He Plays Jazz" is a popular song written by jazz trumpeter Henry Busse, Henry Lange, and Lou Davis. The song was a number one hit for Paul Whiteman and His Orchestra. Henry Busse was a founding member of the Paul Whiteman Orchestra, joining in 1920.

First publication
Paul Whiteman and His Orchestra recorded the song on June 23, 1922 in New York and released it as a Victor 78, 18920-A. The recording was number one for six weeks.

First published in 1922, it was advertised as "A Blues Fox Trot Song" The song is about a trumpet player. The chorus is:

Other recordings
The song has been recorded many times. Red Nichols, Al Hirt, Pete Candoli, Horace Heidt, Harry James, the California Ramblers, Miss Patricola on Victor, the Hoosier Hot Shots on Melotone, the Will Lockridge Orchestra on Score Records, and Henry Busse with his orchestra, have all recorded the song.

The original release was by Paul Whiteman and His Orchestra, of which Busse was a member in 1922. He left the Paul Whiteman orchestra in 1928 to form his own group. Lockridge was a Busse trumpeter whose recording of the song was part of an album tribute to Busse shortly after Busse's death in 1955.
 The song appears in the 1930 Universal Pictures musical revue King of Jazz featuring Paul Whiteman and Bing Crosby.

The Henry Busse Orchestra recorded "Hot Lips" for American Record Corporation (ARC) on June 4, 1934 in Chicago. It was released on the Columbia label, which ARC was in the process of acquiring in a receivership sale; the date of release is unknown. On September 25, Busse's band recorded it again for the newly formed Decca Records (Decca 198), which released it in the United States and in the United Kingdom. The Decca version was later released as a V-Disc, No, 285, in October, 1944 by the U.S. War Department along with "Wang Wang Blues". Columbia Records also released the ARC recording of "Hot Lips" as part of its Columbia Hall of Fame 45 single series.

The Paul Whiteman recording was featured in the Oprah Winfrey movie The Color Purple (1985), directed by Steven Spielberg.

The jazz trumpeter Oran Page reportedly got his nickname "Hot Lips" after diligently practicing Busse's solos on the Paul Whiteman recording of the tune.

A modern recording of this song was released by Alex Mendham & His Orchestra on their 2017 album On With The Show.

References

Bibliography
Busse, Henry; Lange, Henry; Davis, Lou. Hot Lips. (sheet music). New York : Leo. Feist, Inc. (1922).

External links
U.S. Library of Congress. National Jukebox. !922 Paul Whiteman Victor recording.

Foxtrots
1922 songs
1922 singles
Songs written by Henry Busse
Songs written by Lou Davis